Tom Carson (born 26 March 1959 in Alexandria, West Dunbartonshire) is a Scottish football player and coach. Carson played as a goalkeeper for several clubs, including Dundee, Raith Rovers and Dumbarton. He later managed Dumbarton between 2000 and 2002.

History
Tom (or Tam, as he is sometimes known) was brought up in Alexandria, West Dunbartonshire, an area rich in footballing history. One of Tom's 3 brothers, Joe Carson, also played football professionally for Arbroath, Motherwell & Partick Thistle among others.

During his time at Dundee, Carson was sent out on loan 7 times, usually as cover for injuries. His spell at Queen of the South was in the era of the likes of George Cloy.

Carson took his first (and only to date) managerial position in October 2000, taking charge of Dumbarton. He led the team to promotion to the Scottish Second Division in the 2001/02 season, but left soon after. This was rumoured to be after a disagreement between Tom and the board about the amount of money needed to retain the club's new second division status. He was succeeded by David Winnie.

In April 2002, Tom officially registered himself as a squad player to cover injuries but did not make any appearances.

Tom has not returned to football since the end of the 2001/2 season but has often been rumoured as returning to the job whenever the position becomes available. He was also rumoured to be among the running for the vacant Elgin City job in 2003.

Managerial history
includes all league, cup & friendly games

Notes

External links 
 

1959 births
Dumbarton F.C. managers
Dumbarton F.C. players
Dundee F.C. players
Dunfermline Athletic F.C. players
Association football goalkeepers
Hibernian F.C. players
Ipswich Town F.C. players
Living people
Partick Thistle F.C. players
People from Alexandria, West Dunbartonshire
Queen of the South F.C. players
Raith Rovers F.C. players
Scottish Football League players
Scottish football managers
Scottish footballers
English Football League players
Scottish Football League managers
Footballers from West Dunbartonshire